Piwnik is a Polish surname. Notable people with the surname include:

 Barbara Piwnik (born 1955), Polish politician
 Jan Piwnik (1912–1944), Polish resistance fighter

Polish-language surnames